Artem Yuryevich Nych (born March 21, 1995, in Kemerovo) is a Russian cyclist, who currently rides for UCI ProTeam .

Major results

2013
 8th Road race, UCI Junior Road World Championships
2014
 3rd Road race, National Under-23 Road Championships
 6th Overall Tour of Szeklerland
1st Young rider classification
 8th Trofeo Internazionale Bastianelli
2015
 1st  Road race, National Under-23 Road Championships
 2nd Trofeo Banca Popolare di Vicenza
 4th Memorial Oleg Dyachenko
 5th Overall Five Rings of Moscow
 9th Overall Grand Prix of Sochi
2016
 6th Gran Premio Palio del Recioto
 6th Ronde van Vlaanderen U23
 8th Time trial, UEC European Under-23 Road Championships
 8th Trofeo Banca Popolare di Vicenza
 10th Overall Route du Sud
2017
 2nd Road race, National Road Championships
 3rd Gran Premio di Poggiana
 6th Overall Grand Prix Priessnitz spa
2018
 7th Overall Tour of Croatia
 10th Overall Tour of Austria
2019
 3rd Time trial, National Road Championships
 6th Overall Tour de l'Ain
 9th Overall Vuelta a Asturias
2021
 1st  Road race, National Road Championships
 8th Overall Presidential Tour of Turkey

References

External links

1995 births
Living people
Russian male cyclists
European Games competitors for Russia
Cyclists at the 2019 European Games
Sportspeople from Kemerovo